Gareth Davies (born 10 March 1965) is a physician and Consultant in Emergency Medicine and Pre-hospital Emergency Medicine, working for the NHS at the Royal London Hospital, Whitechapel. He is best known for his role as lead doctor of the flight crew for the London Air Ambulance (HEMS) and has been seen many times on the BBC documentary television series Trauma, Trauma Uncut and An Hour to Save Your Life He has also made an appearance as a mentor in an episode of the CBBC series Hero Squad, and on Channel 5's Trauma Doctors.

Early life and education
Davies was born and grew up in Douglas on the Isle of Man off the north-west coast of England, famous for its Isle of Man TT motorcycle racing event. From a very early age Gareth had been interested in motor sport and saw the consequences when people fell off their bikes. He would often follow ambulances to the scenes of these accidents to see what care was provided for those who were hurt, noting the advanced medical help required.

On From the Top: Gareth Davies, an educational program broadcast on Channel 4, Gareth recalled watching a television program from the U.S. at the age of 16: "It was about these firemen who delivered medical care as firemen, and they called themselves paramedics and that I thought was absolutely fantastic!" He formed a goal to become a paramedic. At that time paramedicine was in its infancy, so his options were either to go into the fire service and try and do medicine, or pursue medical training. He chose the latter, hoping that one day he would be able to treat people at the roadside in a paramedic capacity.

After his A-levels Davies completed five years of medical training at Sheffield Medical School.

His work on 7 July 2005
On the day of the 7 July 2005 London bombings, Gareth Davies was mobilised by London Ambulance Service along with the rest of the London HEMS team. He was deployed at Aldgate where he was the Medical Incident Officer, and later re-deployed with others to Kings Cross. His work on that day led to him being nominated for the Great Briton Award in 2005 under the category of Public Life, although the title was awarded to Sebastian Coe for his efforts in bringing the Olympics to London in 2012.

Management responsibilities
In addition to his NHS duties, he serves as the Medical Director of London's Air Ambulance Ltd (Company No. 2337239) and as a director of a number of other companies including London Air Ambulance Trading Ltd (Company No. 04836606), UK HEMS Ltd (Company No. 06491323), EMSC Ltd (Company No. 07179442) and Medical Excellence Ltd (Company No. 05668741).

External links
Official Website of London's Air Ambulance
Personal profile of Dr.Gareth Davies

References

1965 births
Living people
21st-century English medical doctors